Edvard Hočevar (31 May 1926 – 1 February 1998) was a Slovenian footballer.

He was a forward and he played with FK Partizan in the Yugoslav First League.  He also played with NK Olimpija ljubljana (named nk Odred at time) in the 1958–59 Yugoslav Second League.

Edvard Hočevar played one match and scored once for the Yugoslav national team in a friendly match against Denmark played on 28 May 1950 (a 5-1 win).

References

1926 births
1998 deaths
Slovenian footballers
Yugoslav footballers
Yugoslavia international footballers
Association football forwards
NK Olimpija Ljubljana (1945–2005) players
FK Partizan players
Yugoslav First League players